Seymour "Sy" Abraham Liebergot (born February 15, 1936 in Camden, New Jersey) is a retired NASA flight controller, serving during the Apollo program.  Liebergot was an EECOM controller and was responsible for the electrical and environmental systems on board the Command Module.  In 1970, he was part of the team that guided Apollo 13 back to Earth following the explosion which crippled the spacecraft.

He began his career in 1963 with North American Aviation after graduating from California State University, Los Angeles.  In 1964, he came to NASA.  Liebergot was a Deputy Flight Director on Apollo 4, then an EECOM flight controller on Apollo 8–15. On Apollo 17, he served as CSSB SPAN (SPacecraft ANalysis room) Support. He continued as a controller in the Skylab and ASTP missions.

In popular culture
In the 1995 film Apollo 13, Liebergot was played by Clint Howard, the brother of director Ron Howard.

References

External links
 Sy Liebergot's homepage
 Information on Liebergot's book Apollo EECOM
 Interview with Sy Liebergot (SpaceVidcast)
 Recording of a talk by Liebergot. He described his Apollo 13 experience in a 48-minute talk in 2006.
 Detailed behind-the-scenes tour by Sy of NASA's Mission Control Center.

1936 births
20th-century American Jews
Living people
California State University, Los Angeles alumni
NASA flight controllers
People from Camden, New Jersey
People from Pearland, Texas
21st-century American Jews